Study in Brown  (EmArcy Records, 1955) is a Clifford Brown and Max Roach album. The album consists predominantly of originals by members of the band. The songs "Lands End", by tenor saxophonist Harold Land, and "Sandu", by Brown, have gone on to become jazz standards. The song "George's Dilemma" is also known as "Ulcer Department". Brown's solo on "Cherokee" is among the most acclaimed solos in jazz.

Track listing
"Cherokee" (Ray Noble) - 5:44
"Jacqui" (Richie Powell) - 5:11
"Swingin'" (Clifford Brown) - 2:52
"Lands End" (Harold Land) - 4:57
"George's Dilemma" (Brown) - 5:36
"Sandu" (Brown) - 4:57
"Gerkin for Perkin" (Brown) - 2:56
"If I Love Again" (Jack Murray and Ben Oakland) - 3:24
"Take the "A" Train" (Billy Strayhorn) - 4:16

Personnel
Clifford Brown - trumpet
Harold Land - tenor saxophone
Richie Powell - piano
George Morrow -  double bass
Max Roach - drums

References

1955 albums
Bebop albums
Hard bop albums
Clifford Brown albums
Max Roach albums
EmArcy Records albums